Großwelzheim Nuclear Power Plant,, was an experimental nuclear power plant consisting of one 25 MW reactor in Großwelzheim, a district of Karlstein am Main.

The prototype boiling water reactor, designed to produce superheated steam was under construction from 1965 to 1969, and was first connected to the power grid on October 14th, 1969. The reactor could not be run at full capacity due to structural defects in the fuel elements. Because of this, the reactor was switched off about a year and a half later on April 20, 1971.

After the decommissioning in 1983, the plant was used for reactor safety tests until dismantling was completed in 1998. 

The site also included the Kahl Nuclear Power Plant, the first nuclear reactor to be built in Germany, as well as the first to be shut down. This makes the site the first in Germany where two reactors have been dismantled. 

When the community of Karlstein am Main was created in 1975, an atomic symbol was included in the municipal coat of arms, due to the two reactors present in the newly formed town.

Reactors 
Großwelzheim Nuclear Power Plant had one Reactor:

References 

Former nuclear power stations in Germany
Economy of Bavaria
Buildings and structures in Bavaria
Former nuclear power stations